Events in the year 1919 in Bulgaria.

Incumbents

Events 

 17 August – The Bulgarian Agrarian National Union, which won 77 of the 236 seats in the parliament following parliamentary elections. Voter turnout was 54.5%.

References 

 
1910s in Bulgaria
Years of the 20th century in Bulgaria
Bulgaria
Bulgaria